Tun Lwin Moe (born 8 March 1999) is a retired Burmese Lethwei fighter. He was signed to the International Lethwei Federation Japan and is the  Lethwei World Champion under traditional rules.

Lethwei career 
Tun Lwin Moe has been trained by Kyaw Soe, the head coach at Nagamahn and father of Lethwei Champion Too Too. and was formerly employed at the now-defunct Lethwei camp Kyaw Lin Naing. He is one of the few boxers who started their careers in Lethwei without having competed before for Region-, State- or government-funded Golden Belt Championship titles. Starting with a few under-card fights in Yangon in 2015, he already competed in the following year against top talents.

Eye problem 
In November 2018, it was announced that Tun Lwin Moe had been removed from the Lethwei in Japan 10: Nori event by ILFJ officials. The reason was an abnormality in his left eye that was discovered during a medical examination on October 28. Tun Lwin Moe had a fight in Thailand on the day and the discovery sparked a minor debate on fighter safety and whether the officials in Myanmar had been negligent over his and other individual's well-being. Tun Lwin Moe had eye surgery on November 14.

In October 2019, Tun Lwin Moe and his father said in an interview that Tun Lwin Moe's vision had not yet fully returned and that the recovery could take up to 2 years. In the meantime, they would focus on the career of his younger brother Thant Zin instead. In January 2020 however, he would announce that he had an upcoming fight with Yokpetch Petchkasem on short notice. Although the fight got cancelled he took a replacement fight in facing Saw Min Naing in February. He has since retired from competition due to lasting eye damage.

Outside the ring 
In 2022, Tun Lwin Moe opened a Lethwei gym called Tawwinirra in the Irrawaddy Division, Bogale where he trains aspiring Lethwei fighters.

Titles 

 2016 60 kg Myanmar Lethwei World Championship Belt
 2017 60 kg Myanmar Lethwei World Championship Belt

Professional Lethwei record 

|- style="background:#c5d2ea;"
|2020-02-19
|Draw
| align="left" | Saw Min Naing
|Andin village Challenge Fights
|Ye Township, Myanmar
|Draw
|5
|- style="background:#c5d2ea;"
|2018-10-28
|Draw
| align="left" | Jaising CMA Gym
|Diamond Super Fight
|Mahachai, Thailand
|Draw
|5
|- style="background:#cfc;"
|2018-09-13
|Win
| align="left" | Sojun Ikkyu
|Lethwei in Japan 9: Kodo
|Tokyo, Japan
|TKO
|3
|- style="background:#c5d2ea;"
|2018-08-19
|Draw
| align="left" | Keerati Sririttidet (Meeboon)
|2018 Myanmar Lethwei World Championship
|Yangon, Myanmar
|Draw
|5
|- style="background:#cfc;"
|2018-06-29
|Win
| align="left" | Hwang Chang-hwan
|Lethwei in Japan 8: Samurai
|Tokyo, Japan
|TKO
|3
|- style="background:#cfc;"
|2018-03-31
|Win
| align="left" | Saw Hla Kyi Htoo
|Kya-In Seikkyi Challenge Fights
|Kyainseikgyi Township, Myanmar
|TKO
|3
|- style="background:#cfc;"
|2018-03-25
|Win
| align="left" | Daj Jitmuangnon
|Lethwei in Thailand
|Mahachai, Thailand
|KO
|2
|- style="background:#cfc;"
|2018-02-28
|Win
| align="left" | Petchsit
|Magha Puja Challenge Fights
|Lamaing Township, Myanmar
|KO
|1
|- style="background:#c5d2ea;"
|2018-02-21
|Draw
| align="left" | Shunichi Shimizu
|Lethwei in Japan 7: Yuki
|Tokyo, Japan
|Draw
|5
|- style="background:#cfc;"
|2018-02-10
|Win
| align="left" | Kyar Ba Hein
|Andin village Challenge Fights
|Ye Township, Myanmar
|KO
|1
|- style="background:#c5d2ea;"
|2017-11-15
|Draw
| align="left" | Higashi Shuhei
|Lethwei Grand Prix Japan 2017
|Tokyo, Japan
|Draw
|5
|- style="background:#c5d2ea;"
|2017-10-08
|Draw
| align="left" | Saw Min Min
|Great Tiger Group: Clash of Lethwei Tiger 5
|Mandalay, Myanmar
|Draw
|5
|- style="background:#cfc;"
|2017-08-20
|Win
| align="left" | Alexi Serepisos
|2017 Myanmar Lethwei World Championship
|Yangon, Myanmar
|TKO (Cut)
|2
|-
! colspan="9" style="background:white" |
|- style="background:#c5d2ea;"
|2017-03-26
|Draw
| align="left" | Ye Thway Ni
|Great Tiger Group: Clash of Lethwei Tiger 4
|Yangon, Myanmar
|Draw
|5
|- style="background:#cfc;"
|2017-03-12
|Win
| align="left" | Petchmai SV Terbolek
|Lamaing Challenge Fights
|Lamaing, Ye, Myanmar
|KO
|5
|- style="background:#c5d2ea;"
|2017-03-02
|Draw
| align="left" | Ye Thway Ni
|Lethwei Challenge Fights
|Mandalay, Myanmar
|Draw
|5
|- style="background:#cfc;"
|2017-01-06
|Win
| align="left" | Hnung Lan Lex
|International Lethwei Challenge Fights
|Mandalay, Myanmar
|KO
|2
|- style="background:#c5d2ea;"
|2016-11-27
|Draw
| align="left" | Mite Yine
|Mandalay Rumbling Challenge Fight
|Yangon, Myanmar
|Draw
|5
|- style="background:#c5d2ea;"
|2016-10-27
|Draw
| align="left" | Saw Htoo Aung
|Lethwei in Japan GP 2016
|Tokyo, Japan
|Draw
|5
|- style="background:#cfc;"
|2016-10-09
|Win
| align="left" | Nat Khat Aung
|Great Tiger Group: Challenge Fights 2016
|Yangon, Myanmar
|KO
|1
|- style="background:#cfc;"
|2016-08-21
|Win
| align="left" | Ouka
|2016 Myanmar Lethwei World Championship
|Yangon, Myanmar
|TKO
|2
|-
! colspan="9" style="background:white" |
|- style="background:#cfc;"
|2016-06-19
|Win
| align="left" | Joker
|Myanmar Fight XIV
|Yangon, Myanmar
|KO
|2
|- style="background:#cfc;"
|2016-06-05
|Win
| align="left" | Saw Yar Zar
|Great Tiger Group: Clash of Lethwei Tigers 2016
|Yangon, Myanmar
|KO
|2
|- style="background:#c5d2ea;"
|2016-05-20
|Draw
| align="left" | Kyar Ba Hein
|Lethwei Challenge Fights
|Mandalay, Myanmar
|Draw
|5
|- style="background:#cfc;"
|2016-04-02
|Win
| align="left" | Htal Gyi
|Max Thingyan Fight
|Yangon, Myanmar
|KO
|2
|- style="background:#c5d2ea;"
|2016-03-04
|Draw
| align="left" | Ye Thway Ni
|Great Tiger Group: Clash of Lethwei Tiger
|Mandalay, Myanmar
|Draw
|5
|- style="background:#cfc;"
|2016-02-14
|Win
| align="left" | Saw Darwait
|Heroes vs. Samurais; Myanmar-Japan Challenge Fights
|Yangon, Myanmar
|TKO
|3
|- style="background:#cfc;"
|2016-01-17
|Win
| align="left" | Kyaw Win Aung
|Challenge to Myanmar Champion
|Yangon, Myanmar
|KO
|1
|- style="background:#c5d2ea;"
|2015-11-26
|Draw
| align="left" | Sin Yine Lay
|Bagan Fight at Shwezigon Pagoda
|Bagan, Myanmar
|Draw
|5
|- style="background:#c5d2ea;"
|2015-11-06
|Draw
| align="left" | Htal Gyi
|Taikkyi (Myaungmya) Challenge Fights
|Ayeyarwady, Myanmar
|Draw
|5
|- style="background:#cfc;"
|2015-11-01
|Win
| align="left" | Zaw Chit Aung
|New Generation Challenge Fights
|Yangon, Myanmar
|KO
|2
|- style="background:#c5d2ea;"
|2015-09-27
|Draw
| align="left" | Saw Thurein
|Mandalay Rumbling Mega Fights
|Yangon, Myanmar
|Draw
|5
|- style="background:#cfc;"
|2015-07-26
|Win
| align="left" | Phi Phyo Aung
|Monsoon Fight
|Yangon, Myanmar
|KO
|3
|- style="background:#cfc;"
|2015-06-21
|Win
| align="left" | Soe Moe Aung
|Myanmar Fight
|Yangon, Myanmar
|KO
|2
|- style="background:#c5d2ea;"
|2015-03-03
|Draw
| align="left" | 
|Mon-Myanmar-Thai Challenge Fights, Kyaik Kelasa Pagoda stadium
|Lamaing, Ye, Mon State, Myanmar
|Draw
|3
|-
| colspan=9 | Legend:

References 

1999 births
Living people
Burmese Lethwei practitioners
People from Ayeyarwady Region